Justice English may refer to:

Elbert H. English, associate justice of the Arkansas Supreme Court
John W. English (1831–1916), associate justice of the Supreme Court of Appeals of West Virginia